Linked Hybrid is a building complex built in Beijing, China designed by Steven Holl Architects. It is recognized for its environmental design and uses geo-thermal wells for cooling and heating. Linked Hybrid has won several awards such as the Best Tall Building Overall Award by the Council on Tall Buildings and Urban Habitat in 2009.

Located near the old city wall, it was designed as a pedestrian-oriented combination of public and private space that encourages the use of shared resources and reduces the need for wasteful modes of transit.

Features
Linked Hybrid was built from 2003 to 2009. It has over 2500 inhabitants. It contains 750 apartments, commercial areas, parking, hotel, cinema, and educational facilities including a kindergarten and Montessori school.

Sustainable Aspects
Linked Hybrid's ground source heat pump system shoulders 70% of the complex's yearly heating and cooling load. The system consists of 655 geothermal wells, 100 meters below the basement foundation. The underground wells have taken the place of above-ground space normally needed for cooling towers, increasing available green areas, minimizing noise pollution and significantly reducing the  emissions created by traditional heating/cooling methods.

Linked Hybrid makes use of a technique called displacement ventilation, in which air that is slightly below desired temperature in a room is released from the floor. The cooler air displaces the warmer air, causing it to be released from the room and resulting in a cooler overall space and a fresh breathing environment.

Awards
 Popular Science Engineering Award for Largest Geothermal Housing Complex, USA, 2006
 AIA New York Chapter Sustainable Design Award, USA, 2008
 CTBUH 2009 Best Tall Building Overall and Asia & Australasia, USA
 CTBUH 2009 Best Tall Building Overall
 Architectural Record China, "Good Design is Good Business" Award for Best Residential Project, 2010

References

External links 
 Linked Hybrid on Steven Holl Architects website
 Linked Hybrid on mapolis.com

Buildings and structures in Beijing
Steven Holl buildings
Apartment buildings in China
Residential buildings completed in 2009